The 2013 South American Youth Football Championship was an association football competition for national under-20 teams in the South America (CONMEBOL). The tournament was held in Argentina from 9 January to 3 February 2013 and was won by Colombia, with Paraguay as runners-up.

Colombia, Paraguay, Uruguay and Chile, which were the first four teams of this tournament qualified for the 2013 FIFA U-20 World Cup to be held in Turkey.

Host selection
Argentina was chosen as host country at a meeting of the CONMEBOL Executive Committee on 18 March 2011 at CONMEBOL headquarters in Luque, Paraguay. At the meeting, it was decided to make Argentina the host nation for both the South American Under-20 and Under-17 tournaments in 2013.

Teams
 (hosts)

 (holder and world champions)

 (winner)

Venues
A total of two cities hosted the tournament.

Match officials
The referees were:

 Patricio Loustau
Assistant: Diego Bonfá
 Raúl Orosco
Assistant: Wilson Arellano
 Sandro Ricci
Assistant: Marcelo Van Gasse
 Julio Bascuñán
Assistant: Carlos Astroza
 José Hernando Buitrago
Assistant: Wilmar Navarro
 Carlos Vera
Assistant: Byron Romero
 Enrique Cáceres
Assistant: Darío Gaona
 Víctor Hugo Carrillo
Assistant: Raúl López
 Daniel Fedorczuk
Assistant: Nicolás Tarán
 Marlon Escalante
Assistant: Carlos López

Squads

First stage
When teams finished level of points, the final order was determined according to:
 superior goal difference in all matches
 greater number of goals scored in all group matches
 better result in matches between the tied teams
 drawing of lots

All match times are in local Argentine time (UTC−03:00).

Group A

Group B

Final stage
The final stage was scheduled to take place between 20 January and 3 February.

Goalscorers
6 goals
 Nicolás López

5 goals

 Juan Fernando Quintero
 Nicolás Castillo
 Yordy Reyna

4 goals

 Derlis González
 Diego Rolán
 Jhon Córdoba
 Ely Esterilla

3 goals

 Miguel Borja
 Matías Pérez

2 goals

 Luciano Vietto
 Rodrigo Vargas
 Cristian Cuevas
 Juan Nieto
 Miguel Parrales
 Cristian Benavente
 Edison Flores
 Josef Martínez
 Junior Alonso

1 goal

 Agustín Allione
 Juan Iturbe
 Lucas Melano
 Alan Ruiz
 Danny Bejarano
 Felipe Anderson
 Fred
 Marcos Júnior
 Alejandro Contreras
 Claudio Baeza
 Diego Rojas
 Diego Rubio
 Felipe Mora
 Igor Lichnovsky
 Nicolás Maturana
 Bryan Rabello
 Brayan Perea
 Jherson Vergara Amú
 Carlos Armando Grueso
 José Francisco Cevallos
 Rodrigo Alborno
 Ángel Cardozo
 Cecilio Domínguez
 Gustavo Gómez
 Jorge Rojas
 Jean Deza
 Miguel Araujo
 Edwuin Gómez
 Andy Polo
 Rodrigo Aguirre
 Diego Laxalt
 Rubén Bentancourt
 Mauricio Formiliano
 Juan Pablo Añor

Own goal
 Luis León (for Brazil)

See also
2013 FIFA U-20 World Cup

References

External links
Tournament at CONMEBOL.com 

2013
2013 South American Youth Championship
South American Youth Championship
South American Youth Championship
2013 in youth association football